Edith Greindl (1905 – 2004) was a leading Belgian art historian specializing in Flemish paintings of the 17th century.

Her overview of the “golden age of Flemish painting” was translated into Dutch from the original French. She was a pupil of Leo van Puyvelde along with Marie-Louise Hairs and her 1938 doctoral thesis on Flemish still life painting for the University of Liège was published later in 1956. She is credited with the first academic study of Flemish still-life painters such as Jacob van de Kerckhoven and Andries Daniels. She was awarded Chevalier de l'Ordre de Léopold for service in the arts.

Works 
 Corneille de Vos : portraitiste flamand (1584-1651), 1944
 Les peintres flamands de nature morte au XVIIe siècle, 1956
 Jan Vermeer, 1632-1675, 1961
 XVIIe siècle : l'âge d'or de la peinture flamande, 1989
 De Rubens à Van Dyck : l'âge d'or de la peinture flamande, 1994

References 

 Works in Worldcat

People from Antwerp
Belgian art historians
1905 births
2004 deaths
People from Saint-Gilles, Belgium